The BlackStar Film Festival is a Philadelphia film festival focused on films about and by black, brown and indigenous people from around the world. It has been described as the "Black Sundance.

The festival is named after Marcus Garvey's shipping line, the Black Star Line. It was founded in 2012 by Maori Karmael Holmes, initially as a one-day "microfestival" that in success became a four-day international event. Backers of the festival include the MacArthur Foundation, the Knight Foundation, HBO, CAA, Comcast, and Lionsgate.

The first festival included a master class and screening of part of Middle of Nowhere by Ava DuVernay. Later festivals have included films by Gabourey Sidibe, Janine Sherman Barrois, Darius Clark Monroe, Nijla Baseema Mu’min, and Naima Ramos-Chapman. Panels have included Bradford Young, Rashid Shabazz, Spike Lee, and Tarana Burke.

The Advisory Board of the festival is Yaba Blay, Akiba Solomon, Ahmir “Questlove” Thompson, and Tariq “Black Thought” Trotter.

References 

Film festivals established in 2012
Film festivals in Philadelphia
African-American film festivals
2012 establishments in Pennsylvania